This is a list of comedy television series (including web television and miniseries)  which feature lesbian, gay, bisexual, and transgender characters. Non-binary, pansexual, asexual, and graysexual characters are also included. The orientation can be portrayed on-screen, described in the dialogue or mentioned.

1930s

1950s

1970s

1980s

1990s

2000s

2010s

2020s

See also

 List of fictional asexual characters
 List of fictional intersex characters
 List of fictional non-binary characters
 List of fictional pansexual characters
 List of animated series with LGBTQ+ characters
 List of comedy-drama television series
 List of comedy and variety television programs with LGBT cast members
 List of horror television series with LGBT characters
 List of made-for-television films with LGBT characters
 List of reality television programs with LGBT cast members
 List of LGBT characters in soap operas
 List of LGBT characters in television and radio

References

Book Sources

Further reading
 
 
 

GLAAD Primetime Television Season Reports

Comedy series characters
Comedy television series